Michelle Christine Heaton (born 19 July 1979) is an English pop singer, actress and television personality. She was a member of the pop group Liberty X from 2001 until they announced their split in 2007; they reformed one year later for a small gig. In October 2012, it was confirmed the group would reform for a one-off appearance at the Hammersmith Apollo and feature in the ITV2 series The Big Reunion with other pop groups Atomic Kitten, B*Witched, Five, 911 and Honeyz.

Early life
Heaton was born in Gateshead, Tyne and Wear, England, on 19 July 1979. A former student of Emmanuel City Technology College in Gateshead and Newcastle College of Performing Arts, She began her singing career in the group Sirens in the late 1990s with other girls from the northeast of England.

Music career
While the five winning contestants of Popstars formed Hear'Say, the five runner-up contestants formed the group Liberty. The name Liberty was chosen to reflect the freedom the members experienced following their participation in Popstars. Amidst pejorative media commentary (including the term "Flopstars"), the act proceeded to sign a multimillion-pound record contract with Richard Branson's independent record label, V2 records. Shortly after forming, Liberty received a legal challenge in the UK High Court from a funk R&B band, also called "Liberty", who achieved success in the 1990s, including being awarded Capital Radio Band of the Year, playing Wembley Arena, European tours and the release of albums in the USA, Europe and UK. The original Liberty claimed that the newly formed Liberty was taking advantage of the goodwill that had been created by the former's success (known in English law as the "tort of passing off"). The final judgment was in favour of the funk R&B band and the ex-Popstars then asked readers of  The Sun to suggest a new name.

The winning name was "X Liberty", but the group used the entry as the basis for the official title, "Liberty X". Liberty X enjoyed seven Top 10 singles from 2001 to 2005. Their biggest hit, "Just a Little", reached Number 1 in May 2002. "Thinking It Over", "Got To Have Your Love", "Song 4 Lovers", and "Holding on for You" all reached the top 5 in the UK Singles Chart. Their debut album, Thinking It Over, reached Number 3 in June 2002. Liberty X released another 2 albums, Being Somebody and X, which reached Numbers 12 and 27, respectively. Liberty X won two Brit Awards: for Best British Single and Best British Breakthrough Artist. From 2004 until 2007, Heaton contributed a regular column to the Hotstars section of OK! magazine. In 2004, she appeared in the fitness DVD Liberty X-Toned. In October 2007, shortly after Liberty X's split and final performance, Heaton signed a two album solo deal with 19 Entertainment, however, for unknown reasons, she left the label two months later.

Television career
In 2021, Michelle appeared on the UK television show Loose Women to speak about her alcohol addiction and her time in rehab.
In 2005, Michelle was featured in the MTV UK and Ireland reality television production, Totally Scott-Lee, based around the musical career of Lisa Scott-Lee. In May 2006, Heaton played in goal for England in the Celebrity World Cup Soccer Six tournament. In December 2006, Heaton was a contestant on a celebrity couples edition of Weakest Link. She has appeared in the three-part documentary series Michelle & Andy's Big Day on ITV2 and as a reporter in Australia for GMTV. Heaton was one of the judges on You're a Star, an Irish talent show run on RTÉ in 2008.

On 2 January 2008, she appeared in a documentary The Truth about Binge drinking, broadcast on ITV1, where she aimed to drink more than the recommended amount of alcohol for thirty days, to show the price that binge drinkers pay for their habits. She consumed a total of 349 units of alcohol over the space of 21 days. Her body fat index increased from 25% to 29%, and her liver dysfunction increased from 16% to 86%. She ended the binge early after suffering heart palpitations and prolonged pins and needles. In 2008, she appeared on the reality television show Fáilte Towers on RTÉ One in Ireland. Heaton also appeared on a celebrity edition of Come Dine with Me, aired on 17 September 2008, alongside fellow celebrities Peter Stringfellow, Lee Ryan, and Linda Barker. Heaton finished in third place, scoring 21 points. The fourth series of The Podge and Rodge Show, an Irish spoof chat show on RTÉ One with two bizarre puppet brother farmers as the interviewers, began on 20 October 2008 with Heaton appearing as a guest host for one show.

Heaton appeared in the sixth series of Celebrity Big Brother. She was the ninth person to enter the house. In week 3, Heaton faced the public vote against Ulrika Jonsson and was voted out of the house on Monday 19 January. She was the third housemate to have faced eviction. In 2009, following her appearance on Celebrity Big Brother, Michelle appeared as an elf on Ant & Dec's Saturday Night Takeaway on Saturday 21 March 2009. Michelle also appeared on Snog Marry Avoid? on BBC Three (Monday 23 March 2009). Michelle appeared on ITV2's I'm A Celebrity Get Me Out of Here Now alongside Janice Dickinson in Australia from 16 November 2009 until 23 November. She regularly features on the ITV2 reality shows of Katie Price.

She also appeared on the second-season finale of the Irish version of The Apprentice, broadcast on 14 December 2009, where she was the celebrity guest of eventual winner Steve Rayner, who had the task of organising a launch party for the new Ford Fiesta car. As she pulled back the sheet to unveil the new car her foot got caught and she fell to the floor. Fortunately, she managed to get up and continue presenting. Michelle starred in Aladdin at the Southport Theatre where she played the role of Princess Jasmine.
Michelle toured the UK as Gabby in the comedy play, The Naked Truth in 2010 and early 2011. In February 2011 Michelle was a guest interviewer on the new Channel 5 programme OK!TV. Michelle announced she will be starring as Aladdin in pantomime at Harpenden Public Halls for December 2015.
In December 1998, before she found fame through her music, Michelle played a minor role in a reconstruction for the BBC show Crimewatch.

In January 2023, Heaton competed in the fifteenth series of Dancing on Ice, paired with Łukasz Różycki. They were the second couple to be eliminated from the competition, finishing in 10th place.

Personal life
Michelle married singer Andy Scott-Lee in October 2006 and announced their split in June 2008. She married Irish businessman Hugh Hanley in The Bahamas in July 2010. They have two children, a daughter (b.11 January 2012), and a son (b.28 February 2014).

In 2012, Heaton was diagnosed with a mutated BRCA2 gene and then found out that she had an 80% chance of developing breast cancer and a 30% chance of developing ovarian cancer. She underwent a double mastectomy and had breast reconstructive surgery in November 2012. During a part recorded and part live interview, Michelle stated that her daughter Faith has a 50% chance of inheriting the mutated gene that she has. Her father is a BRCA2 carrier. In 2015 she also underwent a complete hysterectomy and oophorectomy to reduce her risk of developing ovarian cancer.

Filmography

Discography

Featured singles

References

External links
 
 

1979 births
Living people
Liberty X
Musicians from Tyne and Wear
Participants in Irish reality television series
Actors from Gateshead
Actresses from Tyne and Wear
Heaton, Michelle